When The Deer Wore Blue is an album by Figurines, released in 2007.

Track listing
"Childhood Verse" – 3:47
"The Air We Breathe" – 3:47
"Hey, Girl" – 2:34
"Drove you Miles" – 3:43
"Let's Head Out" – 3:01
"Good Old Friends" – 3:59
"Drankard's Dream" – 7:29
"Half Awake, Half Aware" – 2:10
"Angles of the Bayou" – 4:40
"Bee Dee" – 3:18
"Cheap Place to Spend the Night" – 4:24
"Lips of the Soldier" – 2:47
"Everyone" (hidden track) – 2:30

2007 albums
Figurines albums
Paper Bag Records albums